John Honychurch may refer to:

John Martin (died 1545), alias John Honychurch, MP
John Martin (died ?1592), alias John Honychurch, MP